HMS King Alfred was one of four  armoured cruisers built for the Royal Navy around 1900. She served as flagship of the China Station from 1906 until relieved in 1910. Upon her return home that year, she was placed in reserve before being recommissioned in mid-1914. She was assigned to the 6th Cruiser Squadron of the Grand Fleet at the beginning of World War I. She was transferred to the 9th Cruiser Squadron in 1915 and assigned to convoy protection duties by the end of the year. King Alfred participated in the unsuccessful searches for the German commerce raider  in 1916–17 before beginning to escort convoys later that year. The ship was torpedoed by a German submarine in 1918, but returned to service. She was sold for scrap in 1920.

Design and description
King Alfred was designed to displace . The engines were powered by 43 Belleville boilers.

Her main armament consisted of two breech-loading (BL)  Mk X guns in single gun turrets, one each fore and aft of the superstructure. Her secondary armament of sixteen BL 6-inch Mk VII guns was arranged in casemates amidships. Eight of these were mounted on the main deck and were only usable in calm weather. A dozen quick-firing (QF) 12-pounder 12 cwt guns were fitted for defence against torpedo boats. Two additional 12-pounder 8 cwt guns could be dismounted for service ashore. King Alfred also carried three 3-pounder Hotchkiss guns and two submerged  torpedo tubes.

By April 1918, the ship had all of the lower casemates for her six-inch guns plated over and six of them remounted on the upper deck so they could be used in heavy weather. Several twelve-pounders were removed to make room for the six-inch guns.

The armour of the gun turrets and their barbettes was 6 inches thick while the casemate armour was 5 inches thick.

Construction and service

King Alfred, named after Alfred the Great, Anglo-Saxon King of Wessex, was laid down on 11 August 1899 by Vickers, Sons & Maxim at their shipyard in Barrow-in-Furness and launched on 28 October 1901, when she was named by the Countess of Lathom. She left Barrow for Portsmouth in early June 1902, and was completed on 22 December 1903.

After commission, she ran aground off Shoeburyness on 5 May 1905. She became flagship of the China Station in 1906 and remained there until 1910. Upon her return home she was assigned to the reserve 2nd Fleet. The owners of Umbre took legal action for damages, and in the resultant court case, judgement was made in favour of Umbres owners, with blame placed on King Alfred.

When recommissioned in 1914, King Alfred was assigned to the 6th Cruiser Squadron, together with her sister ship, Drake, and was briefly deployed at the beginning of the war to blockade the northern exit from the North Sea. She was transferred to the 9th Cruiser Squadron in October 1915. By January 1916, the squadron, under the command of Rear Admiral Archibald Moore in King Alfred, was patrolling the western entrance to the Strait of Gibraltar and unsuccessfully searching for the commerce raider . The raider evaded all the British ships and returned to Germany before sortieing again into the Atlantic in late November. In the meantime, Rear Admiral Sydney Fremantle hoisted his flag in King Alfred on 22 September, succeeding Moore. When the Admiralty received word that Möwe was loose in the Atlantic in early December, Freemantle ordered his ships to patrol the eastern trade routes, but the raider slipped through the gap between squadrons. When the sweep was concluded, the ship returned to Freetown on 25 December. Freemantle was relieved by Rear Admiral Thomas Sheppard three days later. On her return voyage in March 1917, Möwe passed through the squadron's patrol area without being spotted. In July King Alfred arrived at Devonport to begin a refit that was completed on 13 August. She escorted convoys from Dakar and Freetown to Plymouth for the rest of the year. In February 1918 she began escorting troop convoys from Halifax. The ship was torpedoed by UB-86 on 11 April 1918, north of Ireland, killing one man. She was repaired in Liverpool and returned to service. She was sold for scrap on 30 January 1920 and broken up in the Netherlands.

Notes

Footnotes

Bibliography

External links
 

 

Drake-class cruisers
Ships built in Barrow-in-Furness
1901 ships
World War I cruisers of the United Kingdom
Maritime incidents in 1918